Naqib Kola may refer to:
 Naqib Kola-ye Salas, Babol County
 Bala Naqib Kola, Babolsar County
 Darzi Naqib Kola, Babolsar County
 Pain Naqib Kola, Babolsar County